Peter Dennis Silvester (born 19 February 1948) is an English former football forward.

Silvester, a striker, began his professional career with Reading, with whom he played from 1965 to 1970, scoring 26 goals. He then joined Norwich City, with whom he won the Second Division championship in 1972 and scored 37 goals in 100 appearances. He went on to play for Colchester United, Southend United, Reading on loan, Blackburn Rovers and Cambridge United before playing in the United States for Baltimore Comets, Vancouver Whitecaps, San Diego Jaws and Washington Diplomats.

References
 
 
 Peter Silvester at NASLjerseys.com

1948 births
Living people
People from Wokingham
Association football forwards
English footballers
Reading F.C. players
Norwich City F.C. players
Colchester United F.C. players
Southend United F.C. players
Baltimore Comets players
San Diego Jaws players
Vancouver Whitecaps (1974–1984) players
Blackburn Rovers F.C. players
Washington Diplomats (NASL) players
Cambridge United F.C. players
Maidstone United F.C. (1897) players
English Football League players
North American Soccer League (1968–1984) players
English expatriate footballers
Expatriate soccer players in the United States
English expatriate sportspeople in the United States
Expatriate soccer players in Canada
English expatriate sportspeople in Canada